Aukena is the 5th largest of the Gambier Islands in French Polynesia. Aukena is located about halfway between Mangareva and Akamaru, or about 5 km southeast of Mangareva. Aukena is approximately 2.5 km long and about 0.5 km wide, with a total area of 1.35 km2.

Mangarevan oral tradition first mentions the island in the fourteenth century, and archeological excavations show that it has been inhabited since that time.

Gallery

References

Islands of the Gambier Islands